Niederwampach is a village in the commune of Wincrange, in northern Luxembourg.  , the village had a population of 140.

Niederwampach has about 236 residents and an elevation of 417 metres.

Villages in Luxembourg
Wincrange